The Shallow Water Combat Submersible (SWCS) is a manned submersible and a type of swimmer delivery vehicle that is planned to be used to deliver United States Navy SEALs and their equipment for special operations missions. It will replace the current Mark 8 SEAL Delivery Vehicle. The Navy planned to introduce the SWCS in 2018, although "slippage in the development" has delayed its introduction until 2019. , two subs have been delivered to the Navy while another two were in production. The SWCS will serve alongside the Dry Combat Submersible (DCS), a midget submarine with a dry interior being developed by Lockheed Martin as a replacement for the cancelled Advanced SEAL Delivery System (ASDS).

History
The SWCS program was initiated in 2008, after the cancellation of the ASDS, the anticipated replacement for the SEAL Delivery Vehicle. Teledyne Brown Engineering was awarded the $383 million contract to develop the SWCS in 2011, which provides for the construction of 10 submersibles and one training vessel, the first of which was supposed to enter service in 2018. However, delays and cost overruns began as early as 2015, leading Congress to halve the funds available for the program in the FY2016 National Defense Authorization Act. , the prototype boat had been built and was undergoing testing, while introduction was pushed back to 2019. By October, two subs had been delivered to the Navy.

In September 2018 the Defense Security Cooperation Agency notified Congress of the possible sale of 3 SWCSs to the United Kingdom for a total of $90 million.

Design
The SWCS is  longer and  taller than its predecessor, the Mark 8 SDV. The SWCS will have a longer range and higher payload capacity than its predecessor. As such, it will also be about  heavier than its predecessor. Its hull is made from aluminum. The SWCS will also have more advanced computer systems and better navigation, with new systems including a "sensor mast" with an electro-optical periscope, wireless and wired communication between crew members, sonar detectors, and sonar-assisted automatic docking. The computer bus and sensor mast are designed as modular systems so that individual sensors or systems can be swapped out as required by an individual mission and upgraded as desired. Like its predecessor, the SWCS will carry six SEALs: a pilot, a co-pilot/navigator, and four passengers. The SWCS can be deployed from surface ships, land, and Dry Deck Shelters (DDS) on submarines, although the third option is preferred for stealth reasons.

Compared to the DCS it will serve alongside, the SWCS will be able to enter areas that the DCS cannot. It will also be deployable from submarines, a capability that the DCS lacked as of 2015.

The SWCS's larger dimensions will require expanding the DDS to accommodate it.

References

Submarines of the United States Navy
United States Navy SEALs
Wet subs
Midget submarines